Jack Raymond Colback (born 24 October 1989) is an English professional footballer who plays as a midfielder for  club Nottingham Forest.

Colback began his career at Sunderland in 2008, having graduated from their academy, and broke into the team following loans at Ipswich Town of the Championship. After 115 Premier League appearances with Sunderland, his contract expired and he controversially moved to their local rivals, Newcastle United. After he was dropped from the 25-strong Premiership squad for the 2017–18 season, he went on loan to Nottingham Forest for one and a half seasons.

He played once for the England national under-20 team in 2009, and was called up for the senior squad for the first time in August 2014.

Club career

Sunderland
Colback was born in Newcastle upon Tyne, Tyne and Wear and joined the Sunderland academy at the age of 10. On 30 May 2008, Colback signed his first professional contract with the club.

After manager Steve Bruce announced his intention to loan out Colback, he signed for Ipswich Town on loan on 6 August 2009 on a deal that would expire in January 2010. He made his debut for Ipswich in a 3–3 draw with Shrewsbury Town after extra time in the League Cup, which was won 4–2 in a penalty shootout. His Football League debut came in a 2–0 defeat to West Bromwich Albion after being introduced as a 46th minute substitute. He scored his first goal for Ipswich against Blackpool and scored against them again later on in the season in the FA Cup. His form meant the loan was extended until the end of the 2009–10 season in January 2010. He was voted Ipswich's Players' Player of the Season 2009–10.

He returned to Sunderland from a loan spell at Ipswich Town at the end of the 2009–10 Championship season and made his Premier League debut as a 76th-minute substitute against Wolverhampton Wanderers. He was later sent off for two bookable offences, his debut lasting just nine minutes. He made his home debut against Colchester United in the League Cup on 24 August 2010 as a substitute. Colback went out on loan for a second spell at Ipswich, confirmed on 15 October and which lasted until 6 January when he returned to Sunderland.

Colback returned to Sunderland in January 2011, and his appearances became more frequent. Colback started for Sunderland in their FA Cup 3rd Round defeat to Notts County on 8 January. He then came off the bench as Sunderland drew 1–1 against local rivals and the team Colback supported as a child, Newcastle United, on 16 January. He also appeared as a second-half substitute as Sunderland drew 0–0 with Arsenal on 5 March. Colback made his first Premier League start for Sunderland in their 2–0 defeat at Birmingham City on 16 April. Colback also started the following week as Sunderland beat Wigan Athletic 4–1. Colback had arguably his best performance in a Sunderland shirt in their 2–1 win at Bolton on 7 May 2011. Colback demonstrated his versatility by being deployed at left back in the final game of the season at West Ham.

Colback started the first game of the 2011–12 season, as Sunderland drew with Liverpool at Anfield. Sunderland drew 1–1 with Colback playing alongside Lee Cattermole in central midfield. On 26 December 2011, Colback scored his first goal for the club, a deflected effort, in 1–1 draw with Everton in the Premier League. Colback was deployed at left back on New Year's Day 2012 against Manchester City, and helped Sunderland to a surprise victory against the Premier League leaders. He again played at left back in Sunderland's 4–2 win at Wigan two days later, where he sustained a knee injury which ruled him out for a few weeks. On 5 January 2012, he signed a 2-year contract extension which expired in June 2014. Colback returned from injury as a substitute in Sunderland's 1–1 FA Cup draw with Middlesbrough, and returned to the starting line up in central midfield as the Black Cats beat Norwich 3–0 on 1 February. He scored his second goal for Sunderland with a left footed strike in the replay against Middlesbrough at the Riverside Stadium, as Sunderland won 2–1 after extra time to reach the fifth round.

The 2012–13 season saw Colback play regularly at left back due to injuries to Danny Rose, and right back in the Tyne-Wear derby as Sunderland defeated Newcastle 3–0. Following this, Colback is willing to play out in position, so it will help the club's solve their issue.

Following Rose's return to Tottenham, Colback began the 2013–14 season as Sunderland's first choice at left back, before being moved back into central midfield by Gus Poyet. On 28 December Colback scored a last minute goal in the fifth minute of injury time to salvage a 2–2 draw at Cardiff City. Colback made his 100th Premier League appearance on 1 January 2014 in a 1–0 home defeat to Aston Villa. He scored his second goal of the season on 1 February 2014, scoring the third goal in a 3–0 away win against Newcastle United. He scored his third goal of the season on 7 May 2014, scoring the first goal in a 2–0 home win to West Brom, to retain Sunderland's top division safety and relegating Norwich City to the Football League Championship.

With his contract about to expire at the end of the 2013–14 season, then-manager Paolo Di Canio urged to Colback to make a decision on his future at Sunderland. In November, Colback confirmed that talks of a new deal had started after initially rejecting a new contract in the summer under the management of Di Canio. Further talks over a new contract continued in February. In April, it was reported that Colback had turned down a new contract with the club and was set to depart upon the expiry of the contract. Several Premier League clubs made contract offers to sign Colback, but Sunderland refused to give up on Colback and hoped he would stay at the club.

Newcastle United

On 9 June 2014, Colback signed for Newcastle United on a free transfer. He is the first player since Lionel Pérez in 1998 to transfer directly from Sunderland to Newcastle. As a supporter of Newcastle he admitted that due to the rivalry between the two clubs, Sunderland fans would "hate [him] for the rest of [his] life". Sunderland criticised Colback's move to Newcastle United, and described the transfer as leaving a "bitter taste".

Colback made his competitive debut on 17 August as Newcastle began the season with a 2–0 defeat at home to Manchester City, playing the full 90 minutes. Colback scored his first goal for the club on 28 December in a 3–2 win over Everton, intercepting a Ross Barkley clearance to score Newcastle's third of the match. Four days later he scored in the second consecutive game, a 25-yard strike in a 3–3 draw against Burnley.

Colback was targeted by Hull City and Wolverhampton Wanderers for a loan deal in August 2017.  He turned down the offers due to geographical reasons and instead started training with the junior team. He was excluded from the club's official team photo for the 2017–18 season. Benítez justified his exclusion by saying that the club "had decided the squad before".

On 23 June 2020, Colback was released by Newcastle United.

Nottingham Forest
In January 2018, Colback joined Championship club Nottingham Forest on loan for the rest of the 2017–18 season. After joining Forest, he accused Newcastle United manager Rafael Benítez of disrespecting him during his stint at the club, claiming that he was "treated more like a number than a human being". That July, Colback returned to Forest on a season-long loan, with an obligation to a permanent transfer at the end of the league campaign.

After the permanent transfer to Forest did not occur, Colback remained at Newcastle for a further season before returning to Forest on a free transfer from 11 August 2020 onwards. Colback had continued to live in Nottingham after his return to Newcastle United, as his wife and children had settled in the city. His third Forest debut came on 12 September, in a losing effort to Queens Park Rangers.

International career
Colback has received one cap for the England under-20 team, he played in a 2–0 friendly win against Italy at Loftus Road in March 2009. He replaced Marc Albrighton in the 79th minute as a substitute.

On 28 August 2014, Colback received his first call-up to the senior team for the matches against Norway and Switzerland, but had to withdraw from the squad with a calf injury.

Career statistics

Honours
Sunderland
Football League Cup runner-up: 2013–14

Newcastle United
EFL Championship: 2016–17

Nottingham Forest
EFL Championship play-offs: 2022

Individual
Ipswich Town Players' Player of the Year: 2009–10
Ipswich Town Goal of the Season: 2009–10
Nottingham Forest Goal of the Season: 2021–22

References

External links

Profile at the Nottingham Forest F.C. website

1989 births
Living people
Footballers from Newcastle upon Tyne
English footballers
Association football midfielders
Sunderland A.F.C. players
Ipswich Town F.C. players
Newcastle United F.C. players
Nottingham Forest F.C. players
English Football League players
Premier League players
England youth international footballers